The Girl Guides Association of Barbados (GGAB) is the national Guiding organization on the island nation of Barbados. It serves 3,500 members (as of 2017). Founded in 1918, the girls-only organization became a full member of the World Association of Girl Guides and Girl Scouts (WAGGGS) in 1969.

The first Guide meeting in Barbados was held on 30 November 1918 at Government House, Saint Michael. Thereafter, units for Brownies, Rangers and Blossom Guides were introduced.  Most of the Units are based at Primary and Secondary Schools, however there are some Units based at Headquarters and at a number of Churches. The programs of the Association cater to girls and young women between 4 and 25 years.

Its Headquarters is located at "Pax Hill", Belmont Road, Saint Michael, Barbados and is very close to Bridgetown.

Program
The Association is divided in two sections with five sub-sections according to age:
Junior Section:
Blossom Guides- ages 4 to 7
Brownie Guides - ages 7 to 11
Senior Section:
Girl Guides - ages 10 to 16
Ranger Guides - ages 14 to 25
Young Leaders - ages 16 to 23

Organisation
The organisation is divided into four divisions and eight districts. Each division and district is headed by a commissioner.

The council is the general management committee made up of district commissioners inclusive of the executive and all other sub management teams. The executive committee is a sub committee of the council and responsible for the overall management of the organisation.

See also
Barbados Boy Scouts Association

External links
Official website

World Association of Girl Guides and Girl Scouts member organizations
Scouting and Guiding in Barbados
Youth organizations established in 1918